Mijan-e Sofla (also Romanized as Mījān-e Soflá; also known as Mījān-e Pā’īn) is a village in Rezvan Rural District, Jebalbarez District, Jiroft County, Kerman Province, Iran. At the 2006 census, its population was 94, in 28 families.

References 

Populated places in Jiroft County